Jana aurivilliusi is a moth in the  family Eupterotidae. It was described by Rothschild in 1917. It is found in Nigeria.

The wingspan is about 182 mm. The forewings are buffish wood-brown much powdered with black and with a pale buff stigma between which and the base are two irregular incomplete black bands. There are also median, postmedian and subterminal zigzag double black bands. The hindwings are less powdered with black than the forewing and have a large intensely black subbasal patch and antemedian, two postmedian and subterminal crenulate broad black bands.

References

Endemic fauna of Nigeria
Moths described in 1917
Janinae